Bolshaya Chagotma is a rural locality (a village) in Andreyevskoye Rural Settlement, Vashkinsky District, Vologda Oblast, Russia. The population was 11 as of 2002.

Geography 
Bolshaya Chagotma is located 39 km north of Lipin Bor (the district's administrative centre) by road. Malaya Chagotma is the nearest rural locality.

References 

Rural localities in Vashkinsky District